The Baby Blue Movie was a late-night programming block on the Canadian television channel Citytv that primarily aired softcore pornography and erotica films. Initially broadcast from 1972 to 1975 to generate publicity for the then-upstart channel, Baby Blue was the first regularly-scheduled adult television program to air in North America. The series was revived in the 1990s as Baby Blue 2, which aired until 2008.

History
CITY-TV began broadcasting out of Toronto, Ontario on September 28, 1972 as the first commercial ultra high frequency (UHF) television station in Canada. Station founder Moses Znaimer aired feature films as the bulk of Citytv's programming as the station established itself, and hired Brian Linehan to purchase and schedule movies. To generate publicity for the new station and communicate that it was for "mature, urban adults," Znaimer conceived of a regularly scheduled block of softcore adult films to air on Friday nights, which became The Baby Blue Movie. The title was suggested by Znaimer's partner Marilyn Lightstone, who noted that because the films were not "blue" movies (a term for X rated films), they could be classified as "baby blue" instead. I Am Curious (Yellow) aired as the first Baby Blue Movie on September 29, 1972, with the film's companion I Am Curious (Blue) airing the following night. Robert Lantos later joined as a producer after acquiring Canadian broadcasting rights to short films from the New York Erotic Film Festival and selling the rights to Znaimer, which aired as The Best of the New York Erotic Film Festival.

The Metropolitan Toronto Police exerted frequent pressure on Znaimer and Citytv over Baby Blue, and in January 1975 the station was charged with obscenity for the Baby Blue broadcast of Love Boccaccio Style. While the charge was eventually dismissed, Znaimer elected to cancel Baby Blue shortly thereafter; the program had accomplished its goal of generating publicity for Citytv, and the network was running out of acceptable films to broadcast.  On May 2, 1975, the all-ages film Cat Ballou aired in the time slot normally reserved for Baby Blue, with the viewer discretion notice comedically re-phrased to indicate that "the following program is for family audiences."

To mark the 20th anniversary of Citytv, The Best of the New York Erotic Film Festival was screened on September 28, 1992 as a one-off installment of Baby Blue titled Baby Blue Returns. The series was revived as Baby Blue 2 in the late 1990s as a companion to Ed's Night Party, with the viewer discretion warning delivered by Citytv journalist Mark Dailey. CHUM Limited was acquired by CTVglobemedia in 2007 and the Citytv stations were sold to Rogers Media later that year; Baby Blue ceased broadcasting shortly thereafter, with Sex House Volume 1 airing as the final Baby Blue Movie on August 30, 2008.

Programming

Films

 All The Loving Couples
 The Best of the New York Erotic Film Festival 
 Bummer
 Camille 2000
 The Dark Side of Tomorrow
 Deviant Vixens
 Erotic Day Dream
 Fire in Flesh
 The Golden Box
 I Am Curious (Blue)
 I Am Curious (Yellow)
 Love Boccaccio Style
 Love Me Twice
  Sex House Volume 1
  Naked Ambition
 Naked and Free
 Shame, Shame, Everybody Knows Her Name
 Pleasure Palace
 Therese and Isabelle
 Wanda The Sadistic Hypnotist
 Wild Honey

Television series
 Beverly Hills Bordello
 Number 96

Impact and influence
Baby Blue was the first regularly-scheduled adult television program to be broadcast in North America. A 1973 survey by the Bureau of Broadcast Measurement found that the series was viewed by 210,000 of the 450,000 households that Citytv was broadcast to; at its peak, Baby Blue was watched by two-thirds of the television-viewing public in Toronto. The popularity of the series allowed Citytv to set commercial advertising rates for Baby Blue at CAD$250 per minute, nearly double what the channel charged for other programs on its schedule.

In 1975, the theater company Theatre Passe Muraille staged the original play I Love You, Baby Blue, which used the series to examine Toronto's sex culture; the success of the play allowed the company to purchase its current space on Ryerson Avenue, which it occupies to this day. David Cronenberg's 1983 film Videodrome, which focuses on a fictional Toronto-based UHF television station that is infamous for broadcasting sensationalistic material, is inspired by Citytv and Baby Blue.

See also
 Bleu Nuit, a softcore programming block that aired on Télévision Quatre-Saisons in Quebec
 Cinérotique, a softcore programming block that aired on CFVO-TV in Quebec

Notes

References

Bibliography

Further reading
 Bidini, Dave. "It’s a friggin’ nuclear Technicolor smutfest!" National Post, January 30, 2011.

External links
 Baby Blue 2 at Citytv (defunct; link via Internet Archive)

Citytv original programming
Canadian late-night television programming
Canadian motion picture television series
Pornographic television shows
1970s Canadian anthology television series
1990s Canadian anthology television series
2000s Canadian anthology television series